The Abruzzo regional election of 1985 took place on 12 May 1985.

Events
Christian Democracy was by far the largest party, while the Italian Communist Party came distantly second.

After the election Christian Democrat Emilio Mattucci formed a centre-left government (Pentapartito).

Results

Source: Ministry of the Interior

Elections in Abruzzo
1985 elections in Italy
May 1985 events in Europe